Belgium was the host nation for the 1920 Summer Olympics in Antwerp. 336 competitors, 326 men and 10 women, took part in 121 events in 23 sports.

Medalists

Gold
 Edmond Cloetens — Archery, Men's Individual fixed large bird
 Edmond Cloetens, Louis van de Perck, Firmin Flamand, Edmond van Moer, Joseph Hermans and Auguste van de Verre — Archery, Men's Team fixed large bird
 Edmond Cloetens, Louis van de Perck, Firmin Flamand, Edmond van Moer, Joseph Hermans and Auguste van de Verre — Archery, Men's Team fixed small bird
 Edmond van Moer — Archery, Men's Individual fixed small bird
 Hubert Van Innis, Alphonse Allaert, Edmond de Knibber, Louis Delcon, Jérome de Mayer, Pierre van Thielt, Louis Fierens and Louis van Beeck — Archery, Men's Team moving bird 33m
 Hubert Van Innis, Alphonse Allaert, Edmond de Knibber, Louis Delcon, Jérome de Mayer, Pierre van Thielt, Louis Fierens and Louis van Beeck — Archery, Men's Team moving bird 50m
 Hubert Van Innis — Archery, Men's Individual moving bird 28m
 Hubert Van Innis — Archery, Men's Individual moving bird 33m
 Henry George — Cycling, Men's 50 km
 Daniel Bouckaert — Equestrian, Individual vaulting
 Daniel Bouckaert, Louis Finet and Maurice Van Ranst, van Schauwbroeck and van Cauwenberg — Equestrian, Team vaulting
 Men's Team — Football
 Emile Cornellie, Florimond Cornellie and Frédéric Bruynseels — Sailing, Men's 6 metre class
 Frans de Haes — Weightlifting, Featherweight

Silver
 Louis van de Perck — Archery, Men's Individual fixed large bird
 Louis van de Perck — Archery, Men's Individual fixed small bird
 Hubert Van Innis, Alphonse Allaert, Edmond de Knibber, Louis Delcon, Jérome de Mayer, Pierre van Thielt, Louis Fierens and Louis van Beeck — Archery, Men's Team moving bird 28m
 Hubert Van Innis — Archery, Men's Individual moving bird 50m
 Men's Team — Equestrian
 Men's Team — Fencing, Men's Team Epee
 Men's Team — Gymnastics
 Léon Huybrechts, Charles van den Bussche and John Klotz — Sailing, 6 metre class (1919 rating)
 Albert Bosquet, Joseph Cogels, Emile Dupont, Henri Quersin, Louis van Tilt and Edouard Fesinger — Shooting, Men's Team clay pigeons
 Albert Durant, Gérard Blitz, Maurice Blitz, Joseph Pletincx, Paul Gailly, Pierre Nijs, René Bauwens and Pierre Dewin — Water polo, Men's Team competition
 Louis Williquet — Weightlifting, Lightweight

Bronze
 Firmin Flamand — Archery, Men's Individual fixed large bird
 Joseph Hermans — Archery, Men's Individual fixed small bird
 Albert de Buinne, André Vercruysse, Jean Janssens and Albert Wyckmans — Cycling, Men's Team Time Trial
 Roger Moeremans d'Emaüs, Oswald Lints, Jules Bonvalet and Jacques Misonne — Equestrian, Men's Team three-day event
 Louis Finet — Equestrian, Individual vaulting
 Men's Team (Swedish system) — Gymnastics
 Men's Team — Hockey
 Albert Grisar, Willy de l'Arbre, Léopold Standaert, Henri Weewauters and Georges Hellebuyck — Sailing, 8 metre class (1919 rating)
 Gerard Blitz — Swimming, Men's 100m backstroke
 Men's Team — Tug of war
 Georges Rooms — Weightlifting, Lightweight

Archery

Belgium sent 14 archers in its second Olympic archery appearance. The six competitors who competed in the fixed bird events had no international competitions, and took the guaranteed 4 gold medals, 2 silvers, and 2 bronzes. Van Innis, a veteran of Belgium's first appearance in 1900, faced a lone French archer in each of the three individual moving bird competitions; he took two of the three gold medals and one silver. In the team moving bird competitions, the Belgian team faced off against France in the 50 and 33 metre events, beating the French team both times. The Netherlands sent a team for the 28 metre competition, which knocked Belgium down to second place in that event.

Overall, the team took 8 of 10 possible gold medals as well as 4 silvers and 2 bronzes. They had been guaranteed 4 golds, 7 silvers, and 3 bronzes at worst.

Aquatics

Diving

Three divers represented Belgium in 1920. It was the nation's second appearance in the sport. Sauvage became the first Belgian to advance to a diving final, in the plain high diving. He placed seventh in the final standings.

 Men

Ranks given are within the semifinal group.

Swimming

Twelve swimmers, including one woman, represented Belgium in 1920. It was the nation's fourth appearance in the sport as well as the Olympics. Blitz was the first Belgian to reach a final in an Olympic swimming event, and he won the nation's first Olympic swimming medal with his bronze-winning effort in the 100 metre backstroke.

Ranks given are within the heat.

 Men

 Women

Water polo

Belgium competed in the Olympic water polo tournament for the fourth time in 1920, having won a medal each of the prior times but still seeking its first gold medal. The Bergvall System was in use at the time. Belgium blew out Switzerland in the opening round, then squeaked by the Netherlands in the quarterfinals. After defeating Sweden 5–3 in the semifinals, Belgium advanced to the final against Great Britain. For the fourth straight time the two had met in the Olympics, the British side came out on top of the Belgian team, this time by a score of 3–2.

Belgium received a bye into the silver medal semifinals after the loss to Britain. There they faced, and defeated, the United States to take the country's fourth Olympic water polo medal.

 Round of 16

 Quarterfinals

 Semifinals

 Final

 Silver medal match

 Final rank  Silver

Athletics

42 athletes represented Belgium in 1920. It was the host nation's third appearance in the sport, having not competed in athletics in 1900. The best result for the team was Broos's fourth-place finish in the marathon as the Belgians continued to look in vain for their first Olympic medal in the sport.

Ranks given are within the heat.

Boxing 

13 boxers represented Belgium at the 1920 Games. It was the nation's debut appearance in boxing. Hébrants was the only boxer to advance to the semifinals; he was defeated both in the semifinals and in the bronze medal match to finish with fourth place in the bantamweight.

Cycling

15 cyclists represented Belgium in 1920. It was the nation's fourth appearance in the sport, with Belgium having competed in cycling each time the nation appeared at the Olympics. George took the country's first Olympic cycling gold medal by winning the 50 kilometre race. The road cycling team took bronze; Belgian cyclists came close to adding more medals with two fourth-place finishes and one fifth-place finish.

Road cycling

Track cycling

Ranks given are within the heat.

Equestrian

Eighteen equestrians represented Belgium in 1920. It was the host nation's third appearance in the sport, being one of only three countries (along with France and the United States) to have taken part in each Olympic equestrian competition to that point. The Belgian vaulters were the most successful, with Bouckaert's gold medal and Finet's bronze in the individual leading the team to a gold medal in the combined event. The Belgians also had success in the other two competitions, adding a silver in the jumping and a bronze in the eventing, though no others took individual medals.

Fencing

Twenty-two fencers represented Belgium in 1920. It was the host nation's fourth appearance in the sport, having competed in fencing each time Belgium appeared at the Olympics. The best result for the team was a silver medal in the team épée, which was the country's only fencing medal despite having six individual finalists and two teams in event finals.

Ranks given are within the group.

Field hockey

Belgium competed in field hockey for the first time. The team took third place in the four-team round robin, defeating France but losing to Great Britain and Denmark.

Football

Belgium competed in the Olympic football tournament for the second time, winning the gold medal. The Belgians, which had taken bronze in 1900, won the 1920 championship without much difficulty. The squad outscored opponents 8 to 1, including holding a 2–0 lead when Czechoslovakia withdrew from the final in protest in the 40th minute.

 Quarterfinals

 Semifinals

 Final

Final rank

Gymnastics

Forty-eight gymnasts represented Belgium in 1920. It was the host nation's third appearance in the sport. Kempeneers had the best individual performance, finishing fourth. Belgium also sent teams in two of the three team events, winning a silver medal and a bronze.

Artistic gymnastics

Ice hockey

The host nation competed in the inaugural Olympic ice hockey tournament. The team was eliminated in the quarterfinals by Sweden.

 Roster
Coach:  Paul Loicq

 Gold Medal quarterfinals

Final rank 5th (Tied)

Polo

Belgium competed in the Olympic polo tournament for the first time, taking fourth and last place. The Belgians lost to Great Britain in the semifinals and to the United States in the bronze medal match. Alfred Grisar, Maurice Lysen, Clément Van Der Straten and Gaston Peers de Nieuwburgh took part in the tournament.

 Semifinals

 Bronze medal match

 Final rank 4th

Rowing

Twenty rowers represented Belgium in 1920. It was the host nation's fourth appearance in the sport. None of the team's five boats were able to advance past the first round in its event.

Ranks given are within the heat.

Sailing

Fourteen sailors represented Belgium in 1920. It was the host nation's second appearance in the sport. Belgium had the dubious distinction of having the only boat to not win a medal—there was only one event in which more than three boats entered, and the two Belgian boats in that event finished first and fourth. The other two Belgian boats earned a silver and a bronze.

Skating

Figure skating

Two figure skaters represented Belgium in 1920. It was the host nation's debut appearance in the sport. The pair finished in sixth place out of eight pairs.

Shooting

Twenty-four shooters represented Belgium in 1920. It was the host nation's third appearance in the sport. J. Haller and G. Sylva also competed, but in which events is unknown. In addition, five unknown Belgian shooters competed. Belgium finished with a lone medal, the silver in the team clay pigeons competition.

Tug of war

Belgium competed in the Olympic tug of war tournament for the first time in 1920, the final appearance of the sport in the Olympics. The Bergvall System was used. Losing their first match to Great Britain eliminated the Belgians from the gold medal tournament, but a win against the United States set them opposite the Netherlands for the silver medal. Belgium lost this match and was relegated to the bronze medal tournament; there, they again faced and again defeated the Americans to take the bronze.

All matches were best-of-three pulls.

 Semifinals

 Silver medal semifinals

 Silver medal match

 Bronze medal match

 Final rank  Bronze

Weightlifting

Seven weightlifters represented Belgium in 1920. It was the host nation's debut appearance in the sport. Three of the Belgians took medals, one of each type, with François de Haes taking the top spot in the featherweight category.

Wrestling

Twelve wrestlers competed for Belgium in 1920. It was the nation's third appearance in the sport. None of the Belgians won medals, though twice a wrestler was defeated in the bronze medal match. Two of the wrestlers competed in both Greco-Roman and freestyle wrestling.

Freestyle

Greco-Roman

References

External links
 
 
International Olympic Committee results database

Nations at the 1920 Summer Olympics
1920
Olympics